The Mormons are an American punk rock band formed in 1998 in Los Angeles. The band's influences include Devo, Minor Threat, Screeching Weasel, Bad Brains and Talking Heads. Although no band members are members of the LDS Church, they wear outfits inspired by Mormon missionaries: bicycle helmets, backpacks, stud belts, Dickies, scatterings of facial hair and thrift store ties.

The Mormons have been featured in The Salt Lake Tribune and L.A. Alternative. They have received a write-up in BYU NewsNet.

The current band lineup consists of Patrick Jones (vocals), Vince O'Campo (guitar, vocals), Pete Tintle (guitar), Jimmy Castillo (Bass), and Tucker Robinson (Drums).

Band members

Current line-up
Patrick Jones- vocals (1998-present)
Vince O'Campo - guitar, bass (1998-present)
Jimmy Castillo - bass, guitar (2001~2009, 2011-present)
Pete Tintle - rhythm guitar (2008, 2013-present)
Tucker Robinson - drums (2013-present)

Past members
Louie Rodriguez - rhythm guitar (1999-2007)
Johnny Mesa - drums (2003-2007)
Drew Gale - bass (1999-2000)
Dan Buccat - drums, guitar (2007-2013)
Kelly Kusumoto - drums (2007)

Discography

Albums
Statement of No Statement (2004, Nickel & Dime Records)
’’Rock Out Correctly’’ (2016, Self Released)

EPs
Forge Ahead EP (2010, MorMusic)

References

External links
The Mormons official website
The Mormons on Bandcamp
The Mormons on Facebook

Punk rock groups from California
Musical groups from Los Angeles